NGC 3319 is a barred spiral galaxy in the constellation Ursa Major. It was discovered by William Herschel on Feb 3, 1788. It is rich in gas and lacks a galactic bulge.

NGC 3319 is relatively isolated. It is in a small group of galaxies including NGC 3104, NGC 3184, and NGC 3198. The nearest galaxy to it is probably NGC 3198, 4.2 million light-years (1.3 megaparsecs) away.

NGC 3319 is a Seyfert galaxy, with an active galactic nucleus (AGN) that was identified in 2018. NGC 3319 is a candidate for hosting an intermediate-mass black hole. The probability of having the black hole having a mass less than  has been placed at 84%.

Gallery

References

External links
 

Ursa Major (constellation)
Astronomical objects discovered in 1788
Barred spiral galaxies
Discoveries by William Herschel
3319
031671